Eilema umbrigera is a moth of the subfamily Arctiinae. It was described by Paul Mabille in 1900. It is found on Madagascar.

References

umbrigera
Moths described in 1900
Taxa named by Paul Mabille